Vedra Della Chandler is a singer and dancer from Camden, New Jersey. She was born in 1980.

Biography

Education and early career 
Chandler attended Westfield Friends School where she received an education grounded in the spiritual teachings of the Quaker religion. Following Friends school Vedra choose to attend Haddonfield Memorial High School in Haddonfield, New Jersey, where she was captain of the tennis team, Student Council President and Homecoming Queen. She was accepted to Harvard University and graduated in 2002 with a degree in Government. Early on she pursued a career in business as a warehouse supervisor.

Performance career 
Vedra began dancing when she was four years old at the Marcia Hyland Dance and Arts Center in Mt Laurel, NJ. She performed in high school musicals and while at Harvard she danced with the Harvard Crimson Dance Team which earned 5th and 4th rankings at the NDA National Cheerleading and Dance Competitions in 2001 and 2002 respectively. She continued performing while working in the business world, dancing for Bon Joviʼs Philadelphia Soul arena football team. In 2005 she joined the touring company of “Hairspray!”, the hit Broadway Musical.

Later she performed in multiple theater projects around the world. These included productions of Aida, All Shook Up!, High School Musical, and a national tour of The Wizard of Oz. In 2010 she accepted the role of Soul Singer on Cirque Du Soleil's big top touring show, Kooza.

Current activity 
In 2010 Chandler joined Cirque Du Soleil to perform the role of the Soul Singer on Kooza. Her last show was on 5 April 2015 in Bern, Switzerland.

After 10 years on the road performing with musicals and circus, Vedra returned to her hometown of Camden, NJ where she serves as the Associate Director at The Neighborhood Center, Inc. She oversees programming designed to enrich the lives of children and families living in the South Camden neighborhoods.

Vedra currently performs with local theater companies and with local musicians including the Stan Maltz Orchestra and her own band, CamdenPopRock, based in Camden, NJ.

Memberships 
Chandler is a member of the National Association of Negro Musicians and Alpha Kappa Alpha sorority.

Further reading 
 A day in life of a soul singer.

References

Musicians from Camden, New Jersey
Haddonfield Memorial High School alumni
Harvard College alumni
1980 births
Living people
Singers from New Jersey
21st-century American singers